Tanga, or Noho, is a Bantu language of Cameroon and Equatorial Guinea. Limba speakers report some degree of mutual intelligibility and call it "Old Malimba".

References 

Sawabantu languages
Languages of Cameroon
Languages of Equatorial Guinea